The 2022 Kaliningrad Oblast gubernatorial election took place on 9–11 September 2022, on common election day. Incumbent Governor Anton Alikhanov was elected to a second full term.

Background
Anton Alikhanov was appointed acting Governor of Kaliningrad Oblast in October 2016 after Yevgeny Zinichev resigned form the post due to family reasons. Alikhanov won the election with 81.06% of the vote.

Due to the start of Russian special military operation in Ukraine in February 2022 and subsequent economic sanctions the cancellation and postponement of direct gubernatorial elections was proposed. The measure was even supported by A Just Russia leader Sergey Mironov. Position of Kaliningrad Oblast is also unique, as it is the only Russian region-exclave, so some proposed to uphold the election for national security reasons. However, Governor Alikhanov supported direct gubernatorial election. During a video call President Vladimir Putin criticised Alikhanov for using military operation as an excuse for oblast's construction declined, however, Putin endorsed Alikhanov for a second term. Eventually, on 9 June Kaliningrad Oblast Duma called gubernatorial election for 11 September 2022.

Candidates
Only political parties can nominate candidates for gubernatorial election in Kaliningrad Oblast, self-nomination is not possible. However, candidates are not obliged to be members of the nominating party. Candidate for Governor of Kaliningrad Oblast should be a Russian citizen and at least 30 years old. Each candidate in order to be registered is required to collect at least 8% of signatures of members and heads of municipalities (37-39 signatures). Also gubernatorial candidates present 3 candidacies to the Federation Council and election winner later appoints one of the presented candidates.

Registered
 Anton Alikhanov (United Russia), incumbent Governor of Kaliningrad Oblast
 Maksim Bulanov (CPRF), Member of Legislative Assembly of Kaliningrad Oblast
 Yevgeny Mishin (LDPR), Member of Legislative Assembly of Kaliningrad Oblast, 2015 and 2017 gubernatorial candidate
 Yury Shitikov (SR-ZP), Member of Legislative Assembly of Kaliningrad Oblast, attorney
 Vladimir Sultanov (Communists of Russia), former Member of Kaliningrad Oblast Duma (2007-2016), 2017 CPSS gubernatorial candidate
 Vladimir Vukolov (RPPSS), former Deputy Chairman of Kaliningrad Oblast Duma (2006-2011), 2015 gubernatorial candidate

Eliminated in primary
 Larisa Shvalkene (United Russia), First Deputy Chair of Legislative Assembly of Kaliningrad Oblast

Candidates for Federation Council
Anton Alikhanov (United Russia):
Aleksandr Shenderyuk-Zhidkov, former Deputy Chairman of the Government of Kaliningrad Oblast (2017-2018)
Oleg Tkach, incumbent Senator
Oleg Urbanyuk, Member of Legislative Assembly of Kaliningrad Oblast, chairman of DOSAAF regional office
Maksim Bulanov (CPRF):
Rustam Kasumov, businessman
Yevgeny Kravchenko, Member of Legislative Assembly of Kaliningrad Oblast, businessman
Artyom Vertepov, Member of Legislative Assembly of Kaliningrad Oblast, businessman
Yevgeny Mishin (LDPR):
Sergey Kondratyev, salesman
Semyon Kurbatov, Member of Guryevsk Council of Deputies, aide to State Duma member Yaroslav Nilov
Andrey Lyzhov, Member of Legislative Assembly of Kaliningrad Oblast
Yury Shitikov (SR-ZP):
Leonid Kobyak, individual entrepreneur
Vladimir Skrypnik, aide to Yury Shitikov, associate professor of logistics at Kaliningrad State Technical University
Georgy Tsukan, Member of Guryevsk Council of Deputies, businessman
Vladimir Sultanov (Communists of Russia):
Oleg Antonov, businessman
Vladimir Timofeyev, individual entrepreneur
Anna Zueya, individual entrepreneur
Vladimir Vukolov (RPPSS):
Viktor Akulov, pensioner
Dmitry Ivchenko, pensioner
Yury Lyapin, dentist

Finances
All sums are in rubles.

Results

|- style="background-color:#E9E9E9;text-align:center;"
! style="text-align:left;" colspan=2| Candidate
! style="text-align:left;"| Party
! width="75"|Votes
! width="30"|%
|-
| style="background-color:;"|
| style="text-align:left;"| Anton Alikhanov (incumbent)
| style="text-align:left;"| United Russia
| 259,220
| 80.21
|-
| style="background-color:;"|
| style="text-align:left;"| Yevgeny Mishin
| style="text-align:left;"| Liberal Democratic Party
| 20,683
| 6.40
|-
| style="background-color:|
| style="text-align:left;"| Maksim Bulanov
| style="text-align:left;"| Communist Party
| 15,783
| 4.88
|-
| style="background-color:|
| style="text-align:left;"| Yury Shitikov
| style="text-align:left;"| A Just Russia — For Truth
| 12,089
| 3.74
|-
| style="background-color:;"|
| style="text-align:left;"| Vladimir Vukolov
| style="text-align:left;"| Party of Pensioners
| 4,722
| 1.46
|-
| style="background-color:;"|
| style="text-align:left;"| Vladimir Sultanov
| style="text-align:left;"| Communists of Russia
| 4,256
| 1.32
|-
| style="text-align:left;" colspan="3"| Valid votes
| 316,753
| 98.01
|-
| style="text-align:left;" colspan="3"| Blank ballots
| 6,410
| 1.98
|- style="font-weight:bold"
| style="text-align:left;" colspan="3"| Total
| 323,172
| 100.00
|-
| style="background-color:#E9E9E9;" colspan="6"|
|-
| style="text-align:left;" colspan="3"| Turnout
| 323,172
| 38.49
|-
| style="text-align:left;" colspan="3"| Registered voters
| 839,700
| 100.00
|-
| colspan="5" style="background-color:#E9E9E9;"|
|- style="font-weight:bold"
| colspan="4" |Source:
|
|}

Former Deputy Chairman of the Government of Kaliningrad Oblast Aleksandr Shenderyuk-Zhidkov (United Russia) was appointed to the Federation Council, replacing incumbent Senator Oleg Tkach (United Russia).

See also
2022 Russian gubernatorial elections

References

Kaliningrad Oblast
Kaliningrad Oblast
Politics of Kaliningrad Oblast